Isobutyl formate (2-methylpropyl methanoate) is an organic ester with the chemical formula C5H10O2. It is formed by the Fischer esterification of isobutanol with formic acid, with the aid of an acid catalyst. It is used as a flavor and fragrance ingredient because of its odor which is sweet, ethereal, and slightly fruity.

References

Formate esters
Sweet-smelling chemicals